"Jumper" is a song by Dutch DJs Hardwell and W&W.

Background 
Hardwell premiered the song at the 2013 Ultra Music Festival during his set in Miami.

Track listing

Charts

References 

2013 songs
2013 singles
Hardwell songs
Songs written by Hardwell